Forest Hills School may refer to:

Forest Hills School (New Brunswick), a school in New Brunswick School District 08, Canada
Forest Hills School (Franklin, Tennessee), listed on the U.S. National Register of Historic Places

See also
 Forest Hills High School (disambiguation)
 Forest Hills School District